A tally stick (or simply tally) was an ancient memory aid device used to record and document numbers, quantities and messages. Tally sticks first appear as animal bones carved with notches during the Upper Palaeolithic; a notable example is the Ishango Bone. Historical reference is made by Pliny the Elder (AD 23–79) about the best wood to use for tallies, and by Marco Polo (1254–1324) who mentions the use of the tally in China. Tallies have been used for numerous purposes such as messaging and scheduling, and especially in financial and legal transactions, to the point of being currency.

Kinds of tallies

Principally, there are two different kinds of tally sticks: the single tally and the split tally. A common form of the same kind of primitive counting device is seen in various kinds of prayer beads.

Possible palaeolithic tally sticks
A number of anthropological artefacts have been conjectured to be tally sticks:

The Lebombo bone, dated between 44,200 and 43,000 years old, is a baboon's fibula with 29 distinct notches, discovered within the Border Cave in the Lebombo Mountains of Eswatini. 
The so-called Wolf bone (cs) is a prehistoric artefact discovered in 1937 in Czechoslovakia during excavations at Vestonice, Moravia, led by Karl Absolon. Dated to the Aurignacian, approximately 30,000 years ago, the bone is marked with 55 marks which some believe to be tally marks. The head of an ivory Venus figurine was excavated close to the bone.
The Ishango bone is a bone tool, dated to the Upper Palaeolithic era, around 18,000 to 20,000 BC. It is a dark brown length of bone. It has a series of possible tally marks carved in three columns running the length of the tool. It was found in 1960 in Belgian Congo.

Single tally
The single tally stick was an elongated piece of bone, ivory, wood, or stone which is marked with a system of notches (see: Tally marks). The single tally stick serves predominantly mnemonic purposes. Related to the single tally concept are messenger sticks (used by, e.g., Inuit tribes), the knotted cords, khipus or quipus, as used by the Inca. Herodotus (c. 485–425 BC) reported  the use of a knotted cord by Darius I of Persia (c. 521–486 BC).

Split tally
The split tally was a technique which became common in medieval Europe, which was constantly short of money (coins) and predominantly illiterate, in order to record bilateral exchange and debts. A stick (squared hazelwood sticks were most common) was marked with a system of notches and then split lengthwise. This way the two halves both record the same notches and each party to the transaction received one half of the marked stick as proof. Later this technique was refined in various ways and became virtually tamper proof. One of the refinements was to make the two halves of the stick of different lengths. The longer part was called stock and was given to the party which had advanced money (or other items) to the receiver. The shorter portion of the stick was called foil and was given to the party which had received the funds or goods. Using this technique each of the parties had an identifiable record of the transaction. The natural irregularities in the surfaces of the tallies where they were split would mean that only the original two halves would fit back together perfectly, and so would verify that they were matching halves of the same transaction. If one party tried to unilaterally change the value of his half of the tally stick by adding more notches, the absence of those notches would be apparent on the other party's tally stick. The split tally was accepted as legal proof in medieval courts and the Napoleonic Code (1804) still makes reference to the tally stick in Article 1333.  Along the Danube and in Switzerland the tally was still used in the 20th century in rural economies.

The most prominent and best recorded use of the split tally stick or "nick-stick" being used as a form of currency was when Henry I introduced the tally stick system in medieval England in around 1100. He would accept the tally stick only for taxes, and it was a tool of the Exchequer for the collection of taxes by local sheriffs (tax farmers "farming the shire") for seven centuries.

The system of tally marks of the Exchequer is described in The Dialogue Concerning the Exchequer as follows:

The cuts were made the full width of the stick so that, after splitting, the portion kept by the issuer (the stock) exactly matched the piece (the foil) given as a receipt. Each stick had to have the details of the transaction written on it, in ink, to make it a valid record.

Royal tallies (debt of the Crown) also played a role in the formation of the Bank of England at the end of the 17th century. In 1697, the bank issued £1 million worth of stock in exchange for £800,000 worth of tallies at par and £200,000 in bank notes. This new stock was said to be "engrafted". The government promised not only to pay the Bank interest on the tallies subscribed but to redeem them over a period of years. The "engrafted" stock was then cancelled simultaneously with the redemption.

The split tally of the Exchequer remained in continuous use in England until 1826. In 1834 tally sticks representing six centuries worth of financial records were ordered to be burned in two furnaces in the Houses of Parliament. The resulting fire set the chimney ablaze and then spread until most of the building was destroyed. This event was described by Charles Dickens in an 1855 article on administrative reform. Tally sticks feature in the design of the entrance gates to The National Archives at Kew.

See also 
 Bamboo and wooden slips
 Bamboo tally
 Chirograph: a similar system for creating two or more matching copies of a legal document on parchment
 Fu (tally)
 Measuring rod
 Prehistoric numerals

Notes

References

Further reading

External links

Photo of Medieval Exchequer Tallies
Inca khipus
Khipus as ledgers
The Dialogue Concerning the Exchequer

Mnemonics
Writing systems
Mathematical tools
Money
Currency
Bone carvings